Bartlett Yancey High School (BYHS) is a public high school located in Yanceyville, North Carolina, serving students in the ninth through twelfth grade. It is in the Caswell County Schools school district.

History 
The high school is named after U.S. Congressman Bartlett Yancey, Jr. and was founded in 1923. Grades 9–11 were held at the then Bartlett Yancey School. These grades were later moved to a newly constructed high school building in the mid-1930s. It is unknown when a 12th grade class was first added.

Bartlett Yancey High School became the only public high school operating in the county when Caswell County High School closed in 1969 due to school integration and consolidation. It is presently the only high school in the Caswell County school system.

Academics 
Students at Bartlett Yancey High School have the opportunity to take Advanced Placement coursework and exams. The school also offers an associate's pathway in which students can graduate with a high school diploma and an associate's degree from Piedmont Community College within four years.

Athletics 
Currently, sports teams at Bartlett Yancey High School compete in the Mid-Carolina 1A/2A Conference.

In the 2019 football season, the eighth-seeded Buccaneers finished second in the Mid-State 2A and set a school record for wins in a season.

In addition to football, BYHS has sports programs in wrestling, track and field, cross country, soccer, volleyball, tennis, and basketball.

Facility improvement project 
In June 2020, Bartlett Yancey High School began undergoing renovations as well as the demolition of segments of the existing school. A new two-story building was constructed, which included classrooms, science labs, a media center, a kitchen and dining area, a security station, and administrative and guidance offices. Infrastructure improvements were also made throughout the campus. The project's total cost was $35.1 million dollars and was completed in 2022.

Notable alumni 
Mic'hael Brooks (born 1991), former NFL player
Maud Gatewood (1934–2004), artist
John Gunn (1939-2010), race car driver
Neal Watlington (1922–2019), MLB player for the  Philadelphia Athletics
Hugh Webster (1943–2022), North Carolina state senator

References

External links
Bartlett Yancey High School website
Official website Caswell County Schools

Educational institutions established in 1923
Public high schools in North Carolina
Schools in North Carolina
1923 establishments in North Carolina